Arne Quinze (born 15 December 1971) is a Belgian conceptual artist best known for his unconventional and controversial public art installations. Quinze also creates large and small sculptures, drawings, and paintings. In his late teens, he started out as a graffiti artist in Brussels, and he never completed a formal art education.

Installation art
Quinze is known for his trademark sculptures made out of wooden planks. His installations are built to provoke reaction and to intervene in the daily life of passersby confronted with his sculptures. Quinze sees his installations as places where people meet each other again and start conversations.

In 2006, he gained a lot of attention by building Uchronia: A message from the future, a large wide wooden sculpture at the Burning Man festival in Black Rock City, in the Nevada desert, United States. Cityscape (2007) and The Sequence (2008) are two of his giant wooden public art installations in the centre of Brussels, Belgium. It was the first time a sculpture gave the impression touching two buildings in the city center while traffic still passes by underneath it. The installation for the Flemish Parliament became an unequivocal actor in the city. In Munich, Germany, he built Traveller (2008) for French luxury fashion and leather goods brand Louis Vuitton. Other public art installations by Arne Quinze have recently been revealed in the centre of Paris, France (Rebirth, 2008), Beirut, Lebanon (The Visitor, 2009) and Louisville, Kentucky (Big Four Bridge, ongoing)

During the festival Rouen Impressionnée which took place in Rouen in the summer of 2010 he paid tribute to the impressionist Claude Monet by painting Les Jardins/The Waterlilies series for an exhibition in the Abbatiale de Saint-Ouen. The festival was organized as the contemporary component of the Normandie Impressionniste festival, a festival under the presidency of Laurent Fabius, former French Prime Minister, celebrating the impressionist past of the region. Next to the exhibition an installation (Camille) was built on the Boieldieu bridge, a bridge that has been painted by the impressionist painter Camille Pissarro several times.

Like a futuristic substitute for the market squares of old, Quinze sees his installations as places where people meet and converse as they used to in bygone eras. Red Beacon (2010) is placed in the Jing’an Sculpture Park, the pioneer of presenting public art in the heart of Shanghai located downtown in the Jing'an District. His sculptures redefine social space and provide alternative models of interaction.

Other work is focusing on the axiom that people tend to seek a safe environment, a cocoon eliminating the unexpectable. The installation My Home My House My Stilthouse (2011) in Humlebaek, Denmark at the Louisiana Museum of Modern Art shows the visitor a new form of how housing and living can be perceived.

He revealed a virtual installation Rock Strangers (2011) on the Statue of Liberty in New York City, US on 4 July in collaboration with Beck's for their Green Box Project. The project is co-curated, commissioned and mentored by Nick Knight of SHOWstudio.com and producer Sam Spiegel. Commissioned work will only ever appear in the digital realm.

Arne Quinze: "With these sculptures I'm looking for a confrontation with the public, I hope they start asking questions about what their function on this planet is. What happens when putting all of the sudden an alien element in the city, our habitual urban environment? How do we react to unusual objects if we are confronted with them in our daily lives? Who or what remains the stranger, the person confronted with it or the object itself?"

In the context of  Mons 2015 European Capital of Culture, a wooden installation called The Passenger has been built and will remain visible from 6 December 2014 until 19 December 2019. Unfortunately a partial collapse occurred on 24 December 2014. The installation was fully rebuilt on 15 October 2015 and inaugurated on 16 October 2015.

Work
Quinze's artwork is mainly referring to social interaction, evolution, communication, rhythm, the interplay of lines, contrasts and contradictions. Recurring techniques in his work are multiple types of wood, including salvaged wood; cardboard, polyurethane and electrical colors in fluorescent paint. Because of their intense orange-red color the sculptures contrast with their natural surroundings and generate the sentiment of estrangement. People are completely absorbed by the orange initiating astonished reactions.

He creates works in themes such as Bidonville, Stilthouse, My Home My House My Stilthouse, View and Chaos; broadening further on his studies of livability in today's context. All his work has a humane aspect; Stilthouses can be perceived as humans on fragile legs symbolizing the strong nature of man. Bidonvilles are considered to be houses for the future as an apperception on the way how people are living now and tranquilize or accelerate the living process intentionally, provoking open communication in a society of human interaction.

In 2009, Quinze installed a public Stilthouse installation called The Visitor in Beirut, Lebanon near its newly developed Souk complex, and auction house Phillips de Pury & Company invited the artist to present his work at their London gallery. Due to its success early 2010, the exhibition was prolonged at London's Saatchi Gallery in the Duke of York's Headquarters on King's Road.

During Hamburg Artweek (2011) he revealed new work showing a shift in the use of materials including smashed old porcelain symbolizing the destruction of our family traditions.

In June 2014 Arne Quinze created a unique artwork in collaboration with Veridor: 45 kg of precious metal crafted into a „Natural Chaos". This art piece was primarily made of 18-carat rose gold and of the finest 18-carat palladium white gold in rod and pipe form, as well as gold wire and leaves. The piece named Natural Chaos - Golden Edition No. 1 is for sale for EUR 1.8 million on the Internet luxury marketplace JamesEdition.

Personal life
Quinze lives and works in Sint Martens Latem near Ghent, Belgium.

Marriages
Arne Quinze married Barbara Becker at their Miami waterfront home on 9 September 2009. They celebrated the marriage on 12 September 2009 in Berlin, Germany. In October 2011, Barbara Becker and Quinze divorced.

He married An Lemmens on 6 October 2012. In September 2015, An Lemmens and Quinze divorced.

Further reading
 Arne Quinze – Chaoslife - Dokumente Unserer Zeit XXXXVI (German/English); Texts by Cristiana Coletti, Arne Quinze and Petra Schaefer; Chorus Verlag; Mainz 2015; 
 Beate Reifenscheid and Dorothea van der Koelen; Arte in Movimento – Kunst in Bewegung, Dokumente unserer Zeit XXXIV; Chorus-Verlag; Mainz 2011; 
Jean-Pierre Frimbois (Author), Sieghild Lacoere (Author): Modern Contemporary Arne Quinze. Hatje Cantz, Ostfildern 2010, 
Various Authors, Sieghild Lacoere (Editor): Rouen Impressionnee Arne Quinze - Camille les Jardins. Atelier Arne Quinze, Sint Martens Latem 2010
Arne Quinze (Author), Pieterjan Mattan (Author): THE SEQUENCE Arne Quinze. Gestalten, Berlin 2009, 
Arne Quinze (Author), Robert Klanten and Lukas Feireiss (Editors): Arne Quinze WORKS. Gestalten, Berlin 2008, 
Max Borka (Author): CITYSCAPE Arne Quinze. Gestalten, Berlin 2008,

References

External links
The work of Arne Quinze
Sculptures and paintings by Arne Quinze
Portfolio and biography of Arne Quinze
Facebook Arne Quinze
Red Beacon, Shanghai website (2010)
Camille Les Jardins, Rouen website (2010)
The Sequence weblog (2008)
Cityscape weblog (2007)
The creative frenzy of Arne Quinze - La Galerie de Pierre Bergé & associés
Artinfo, "The Curious Constructions of Arne Quinze", Interview
I Love Belgium, Arne Quinze Sculptures, Blog

Living people
1971 births
Belgian artists
Public art in Mumbai